Caloreas schausiella is a moth in the family Choreutidae. It was described by August Busck in 1907. It is found in North America, where it has been recorded from New Mexico.

References

Natural History Museum Lepidoptera generic names catalog

Choreutidae
Moths described in 1907